The Confederación Ecuatoriana de Organizaciones Clasistas Unitarias de Trabajadores (CEDOCUT) is a trade union centre in Ecuador. It has a membership of over 86,000. As of 2006, CEDOCUT organized 92 trade unions, 1.71% of the total number of unions in the country. Its primary base are unions in small and medium-sized companies, farmers and neighbourhood associations.

CEDOCUT was founded on May 15, 1976, after a split from CEDOC. CEDOCUT was legally recognized in October 1988.

CEDOCUT is a member of the Frente Unitario de los Trabajadores, an umbrella organization for Ecuadorian trade unions.

References

External links
www.cedocut.org.ec

International Trade Union Confederation
Trade unions in Ecuador

Trade unions established in 1976